Abraham Alvarenga Urbina (born July 7, 1974) is a Honduran lawyer and politician. A member of the National Party of Honduras, he represented the Lempira Department and was a deputy of 
the National Congress of Honduras for 2006–2010.

References

External links
Profile at the Congress website

21st-century Honduran lawyers
Deputies of the National Congress of Honduras
1974 births
Living people
National Party of Honduras politicians
People from Lempira Department